Ferdows Religious School ( – Madreseh Elmiyeh Oliya)  is a historic school with octagonal design, located in the southwest of Ferdows city, in the center of the ancient city of Toon, in South Khorasan province, Iran.

This school was built in the Safavi period with the effort of Mir Ali Beyk. It has a library, two porches in the east and west sides, a mosque, yard and some camarillas in its sides. This school also has four terraces which are located at the entrance axis in the south and north sides. The cover of library and mosque is dome shaped and the plot of the school is octagonal.

Notes

External links

Buildings and structures in South Khorasan Province
Ferdows
Architecture in Iran
Octagonal buildings
Tourist attractions in Ferdows County
Tourist attractions in South Khorasan Province
Education in South Khorasan Province